Intimidation Games is a professional wrestling supercard event produced by Major League Wrestling (MLW). The event was first held as a television taping for MLW's weekly program, Fusion, on May 3, 2018.

Dates and venues

2018

Intimidation Games (2018) was a event produced by Major League Wrestling (MLW) held on May 3, 2018 at the Gilt Nightclub in Orlando, Florida. The event was a television taping for MLW Fusion and it was the first event under the Intimidation Games chronology.
Results

References

Major League Wrestling shows
2018 in professional wrestling
May 2018 events in the United States
2018 in professional wrestling in Florida